The 2007 FIVB Beach Volleyball Swatch World Championships was a beach volleyball event, that is held from July 24 to 28, 2007 in Gstaad, Switzerland. The Swatch FIVB World Championships are organized every two years, and Switzerland hosted the event for the first time. 48 teams per gender entered the competition making 96 total.

Medal summary

Men's event

Round Robin

Pool N 

|}

Pool O 

|}

Pool P 

|}

Pool Q 

|}

Pool R 

|}

Pool S 

|}

Pool T 

|}

Pool U 

|}

Pool V 

|}

Pool W 

|}

Pool X 

|}

Pool Y 

|}

3rd place ranked teams 
The eight best third-placed teams advanced to the round of 32.

|}

Knockout round

Round of 32

Round of 16

Quarterfinals

Semifinals

Third place match

Final

Women's event

Round Robin

Pool A 

|}

Pool B 

|}

Pool C 

|}

Pool D 

|}

Pool E 

|}

Pool F 

|}

Pool G 

|}

Pool H 

|}

Pool J 

|}

Pool K 

|}

Pool L 

|}

Pool M 

|}

3rd place ranked teams 
The eight best third-placed teams advanced to the round of 32.

|}

Knockout round

Round of 32

Round of 16

Quarterfinals

Semifinals

Third place match

Final

References

External links
Men's tournament on FIVB website
Women's tournament on FIVB website

2007
World Championships
Beach volleyball
Beach volleyball